Charles Edis McNeil (August 7, 1936 – July 1, 1994) was an American professional football player who was a safety for the Los Angeles / San Diego Chargers of the American Football League (AFL).  He played in four of the first five AFL Championship games (1960, 1961, 1963, and 1964), and was a member of the Chargers' 1963 AFL Championship team, an All-AFL player in 1961, and an AFL Western Division All-Star in 1961.  He held the professional football record for 43 years, for the most interception yardage (349) in one season (1961), and most interception yards (177) in one game (also in 1961).  The one-game record still stands. McNeil is the father of professional tennis player Lori McNeil.

External links
McNeil's 1963 Fleer football card

1939 births
American Football League All-Star players
American Football League All-League players
Los Angeles Chargers players
San Diego Chargers players
1994 deaths
American Football League players
People from Caldwell, Texas